Doug Schwab (born August 3, 1977 in Osage, Iowa) is a male freestyle wrestler and NCAA wrestling coach from United States. He participated in men's freestyle 66 kg at 2008 Summer Olympics.

He wrestled at the University of Iowa, where he was a three-time All-American and Big Ten Champion. He also won the 1999 NCAA championship at 141 pounds. He finished his collegiate career with 130 wins, which ranked 10th in school history as of 2012. As a high school wrestler at Osage High School, he was a three-time state finalist (missing the 1994 tournament due to injury). He won the 1996 2A state championship at 130 pounds.

Following his collegiate career, Schwab served as an assistant coach under Tom Brands at Virginia Tech during the 2005-2006 season. He returned to Iowa as a volunteer assistant coach in 2006-2007. He was promoted to full-time assistant for the Hawkeyes from 2007-2010. On August 1, 2010, Schwab was named the ninth head wrestling coach for the University of Northern Iowa.

In May 2014, Schwab inked a seven-year extension to remain the head wrestling coach of the Panthers. The extension came a few months after he led the wrestling squad to a perfect 13-0 dual season and crowned three All-Americans. Three All-Americans (Dylan Peters, Joe Colon, and Joey Lazor) was the most in program history since 2002.

References

External links
 Wrestler profile
 Doug Schwab Profile - Iowa Official Athletic Site
 - Official Site of University of Northern Iowa Athletics

1977 births
Living people
Wrestlers at the 2007 Pan American Games
Wrestlers at the 2008 Summer Olympics
Olympic wrestlers of the United States
People from Osage, Iowa
American male sport wrestlers
Pan American Games silver medalists for the United States
Pan American Games medalists in wrestling
Medalists at the 2007 Pan American Games